Roland Armontel (21 December 1901 – 15 March 1980) was a French actor.

Born Auguste Louis Magnin in Vimoutiers, Orne, France, he died in Paris.

Selected filmography

 Fun in the Barracks (1932) - Barchetti
 Let's Touch Wood (1933) - Jacques de Saint-Preux
 Les Misérables (1934) - Félix Tholomiez (uncredited)
 La dame aux camélias (1934) - Gaston
 Dedê (1934) - (uncredited)
 Women's Prison (1938) - Un domestique
 Three Hours (1939) - Un soldat (uncredited)
 Beating Heart (1940) - Firmin (uncredited)
 Miss Bonaparte (1942) - Arsène
 La Symphonie fantastique (1942) - Eugène Delacroix (uncredited)
 Les Petites du quai aux fleurs (1944) - Le professeur 
 Florence est folle (1944) - Le professeur Wonder
 Box of Dreams (1945) - Amédée
 Jericho (1946) - Muscat
 The Idiot (1946) - Louliane Timofeievitch Lebediev l'ivrogne
 The Royalists (1947) - Beau-Pied
 Man About Town (1947) - Célestin - un acteur de théâtre
 La maison sous la mer (1947) - Dial
 L'arche de Noé (1947) - Verneuil
 The Three Cousins (1947) - Monsieur de Sainte-Lucie
 The Revenge of Baccarat (1947) - Le comte Artoff
 Rocambole (1947) - Le comte Artoff
 Par la fenêtre (1948) - Sabourdin
 Route sans issue (1948) - Guetz
 Scandals of Clochemerle (1948) - Ernest Tafardel - l'instituteur
 Emile the African (1948) - Dibier
 Eternal Conflict (1948) - Robert Ariani
 Le dolmen tragique (1948) - Inspecteur Pauc
 The Lovers of Verona (1949) - Blanchini
 La bataille du feu (1949) - Michel Bonnard
 La vie est un rêve (1949) - M. Brignolet
 The Red Angel (1949) - Le commissaire Martin
 Keep an Eye on Amelia (1949) - Le général Koschnadieff
 Le sorcier du ciel (1949) - Le sacristain
 The Martyr of Bougival (1949) - Le juge d'instruction
 Plus de vacances pour le Bon Dieu (1950) - Michel Angel
 The Dancer of Marrakesh (1950) - Le général
 Minne, l'ingénue libertine (1950) - L'oncle Paul
 Without Trumpet or Drum (1950)
 Véronique (1950) - Loustot
 Le gang des tractions-arrière (1950) - Antoine Pluchet
 The Beautiful Image (1951) - Le pharmacien (uncredited)
 Clara de Montargis (1951) - L'ivrogne
 Le passage de Vénus (1951) - Gustave Bicquois
 Bouquet de joie (1951) - Le gendarme
 The Adventures of Mandrin (1952)
 Monsieur Leguignon, Signalman (1952) - M. Maltestu
 La demoiselle et son revenant (1952) - Le pharmacien
 The Fighting Drummer (1952) - Albert Gambier
 Double or Quits (1952) - Chassagne - le père de Marie
 Deux de l'escadrille (1953) - Le général
 The Blonde Gypsy (1953) - Polyte Roux
 Piédalu député (1954) - Vardivol 
 Mourez, nous ferons le reste (1954) - Le curé
 Razzia sur la chnouf (1955) - Louis Birot, l'ingénieur-chimiste
 The Affair of the Poisons (1955) - L'aveugle
 Don Juan (1956) - The Governor
 Ces sacrées vacances (1956) - Le deuxième campeur
 The Virtuous Bigamist (1956) - Petit rôle (uncredited)
 Burning Fuse (1957) - Antoine
 Miss Catastrophe (1957) - Eugène
 Tahiti ou la joie de vivre (1957) - Le rédacteur en chef
 Sénéchal the Magnificent (1957) - Carlini 
 Three Days to Live (1957) - Alexandre Bérimont
 Quelle sacrée soirée (1957) - James
 His Greatest Role (1957)
 Ni vu, ni connu (1958) - Léon de Chaville 
 Les tricheurs (1958) - Le docteur 
 Drôles de phénomènes (1959)
 The Indestructible (1959) - Pivois
 Nuits de Pigalle (1959) - Arsène
 Tête folle (1960) - M. Cormont
 Un chien dans un jeu de quilles (1962) - Alexandre - le père
 The Devil and the Ten Commandments (1962) - Mercier (segment "Tes père et mère honoreras")
 Sherlock Holmes and the Deadly Necklace (1962) - Doctor
 Valley of Fear (1962)
 Maigret Sees Red (1963) - Le docteur Fezin
 Tomy's Secret (1963) - Fabien Margoz
 La foire aux cancres (Chronique d'une année scolaire) (1963) - Greuzer 
 Is Paris Burning? (1966) - Foot passenger (uncredited)
 Béru et ces dames (1968) - Le supérieur de San Antonio
 Moartea lui Joe Indianul (1968) - Judge Thatcher
  (1968, TV Mini-Series) - Richter Thatcher
 Les aventures de Lagardère (1968) - L'armurier
 Et qu'ça saute! (1970) - Carlos Enriquez
 Perched on a Tree (1971) - Le Père Jean-Marie
 La Bête (1975) - Priest
 Un mari, c'est un mari (1976) - L'amiral
 Le temps des vacances (1979) - Delajambe

External links

1901 births
1980 deaths
French male film actors
People from Orne
20th-century French male actors